The Journal of Neurologic Physical Therapy is a monthly peer-reviewed medical journal covering research on physical therapy. It is published by Lippincott Williams & Wilkins and is the official journal of the Neurology Section of the American Physical Therapy Association and the Associação Brasileira de Fisiotherapia Neurofunctional. The journal was established in 1977 as Neurology Report, obtaining its current title in 2003.

Abstracting and indexing
The journal is abstracted and indexed in:

According to the Journal Citation Reports, the journal has a 2014 impact factor of 1.766.

References

External links

Acaciaplein

Physical therapy journals
English-language journals
Quarterly journals
Lippincott Williams & Wilkins academic journals
Publications established in 1977